Dongfanghong Square is a large square and park in Lanzhou, China. It is located centrally in the city. On the west side, a stadium is located and on the east side the Guofang Department Store mall is located.

The square was given its current name 1968, with fountains and grass patches added in 1981. The stadium on the west side was built in 1984. In 1993, a partially underground shopping mall was constructed, and the square was enlarged.

Metro Station

Dongfanghong Square metro station is located at the north side of the square, it is served by Line 1 and will in the future also be served by Line 2 of the Lanzhou Metro.

References

External links
 
 
 

Parks in Lanzhou
Squares in China